The Atwater Manufacturing Company is a historic industrial property at 335 Atwater Street in Southington, Connecticut.  The company, founded in 1867 and now known as Rex Forge, has long been one of Southington's major industrial employers.  The ten extant buildings of the complex date as far back as 1912, and are an important element of the town's industrial past.  The property was listed on the National Register of Historic Places in 1988.

Description and history
The Atwater Manufacturing Company plant is located in Southington's Plantsville area, on the east side of Atwater Street just north of its junction with Canal Street.  The roughly linear complex extends between the Quinnipiac River, which flows southward to its east, and a former railroad right-of-way (now a multiuse trail) that runs between it and Atwater Street.  There are ten buildings in all, ranging in age from about 1912 to the 1980s.  Most have an exterior finished in corrugated metal, although some of the oldest buildings have painted brick exteriors.  Buildings range in height from one to two stories, with the main forge building the largest; it is covered by a gabled roof with a monitor at its upper level.

The site has a long industrial history, having been the location of Southington's first grist mill in 1767.  Atwater Manufacturing was organized in 1869, and at first manufactured parts for carriages.  In the 20th century it transitioned to the manufacture of parts for automobiles, and now as Rex Forge does custom metal forging.

See also
National Register of Historic Places listings in Southington, Connecticut

References

External links
Rex Forge web site

National Register of Historic Places in Hartford County, Connecticut
Buildings and structures in Southington, Connecticut
Buildings and structures completed in 1912
1912 establishments in Connecticut